Roberto Firmino Barbosa de Oliveira (born 2 October 1991) is a Brazilian professional footballer who plays as a forward or attacking midfielder for  club Liverpool and the Brazil national team.

After starting his career with Figueirense in 2009, he spent four-and-a-half seasons at 1899 Hoffenheim. His 16 goals in 33 games in the 2013–14 Bundesliga season earned him the award for the league's Breakthrough Player. In July 2015, he signed for Liverpool where he earned plaudits for his creativity, goalscoring and workrate, with manager Jürgen Klopp referring to Firmino as the "engine" that propels the club's counter-pressing system. In the 2018–19 season he won the UEFA Champions League, and the following season won the UEFA Super Cup, the FIFA Club World Cup after scoring the winner in the final, and the 2019–20 Premier League title. He also won the FA Cup with Liverpool.

Firmino made his international debut for Brazil in November 2014. He represented the nation at the 2015, 2019 and 2021 Copes América, as well as the 2018 FIFA World Cup.

Club career

Early career
Born in Maceió, Alagoas, Firmino joined Figueirense's youth setup in 2008, aged 17, after starting out at CRB. He was discovered by a dentist, Marcellus Portella. With the latter, he was mainly used as a defensive midfielder.

Firmino made his first-team debut on 24 October 2009, coming on as a half-time substitute in a 2–1 home loss against Ponte Preta in Série B.

Firmino scored his first goal on 8 May 2010, with the winner in an away win against São Caetano. He contributed with eight goals in 36 appearances during the season, as Figueirense returned to Série A after a two-year absence.

1899 Hoffenheim

Firmino signed with 1899 Hoffenheim in December 2010, with the contract running until June 2015. He formally arrived at Hoffenheim on 1 January 2011. Then Hoffenheim manager Ernst Tanner commented that they were "pleased to hire a Brazilian talent". He made his debut a month later in a Bundesliga defeat against Mainz 05, where he came on as a 75th-minute substitute for Sebastian Rudy. He scored his first goal for the club on 16 April, the only goal of a league victory against Eintracht Frankfurt.

He was dropped from the first-team squad along with Chinedu Obasi at the end of November 2011 for showing up late for training, missing the league match against Bayer Leverkusen. He scored two more goals that season, against Wolfsburg and Borussia Mönchengladbach. In the 2012–13 season, Firmino made 36 appearances and scored seven goals.

In July 2013, Russian club Lokomotiv Moscow made a €12 million bid for Firmino. Hoffenheim captain Andreas Beck hailed Firmino's development as "outstanding" in August 2013. On 27 March 2014, Firmino extended his contract with the club, signing a three-year extension. He finished the 2013–14 Bundesliga season tied as the fourth highest scorer with 16 goals, and was named the league's Breakthrough Player.

Liverpool

2015–2017
On 23 June 2015, Hoffenheim and Firmino agreed terms for him to transfer to Premier League club Liverpool for up to £29 million on conclusion of the tournament, subject to a work permit. Liverpool confirmed the signing the following day, subject to a medical. The deal was finalised on 4 July. Firmino made his debut on 9 August, replacing Jordon Ibe for the final 12 minutes of a 1–0 win away to Stoke City. On 21 November, Firmino scored his first goal for Liverpool in a 4–1 victory over Manchester City at the City of Manchester Stadium. In January 2016, Firmino was described by Paul Little of the Irish Examiner as steadily improving during his first season in England, although an inability to combine with centre forward Christian Benteke drew criticism.

However, in 2016, Firmino's form improved as manager Jürgen Klopp played him alone up front in a false 9 role. He scored braces against Arsenal and Norwich City that month; the latter performance, in which he also assisted in a 5–4 win, earned comparisons to Raheem Sterling. With his form improved, Firmino was voted to be Liverpool's Player of the Month in January. Firmino ended the season as Liverpool's league top scorer with 10 goals.

On 23 August, Firmino scored his first goal of the 2016–17 season, scoring in a 5–0 win over Burton Albion in the second round of the EFL Cup. Firmino scored his first league goals of the season in a 4–1 win over Leicester City, scoring a brace, on 10 September. On 29 October, Firmino scored in a 4–2 win over Crystal Palace, and on 6 November he scored in a 6–1 over Watford; the latter result saw Liverpool move to 1st position in the league table, the first time under Klopp. Firmino finished the season with 12 goals in 38 appearances.

2017–18 season

Before the start of the 2017–18 season, Firmino switched his shirt number to 9, with new signing Mohamed Salah taking his number 11. Firmino scored his first goal of the new season on 12 August, scoring a penalty in a 3–3 draw with Watford. On 17 December, he scored in a 4–0 away win over AFC Bournemouth, a result which saw Liverpool become the first team in Premier League history to win four consecutive away games by a margin of at least three goals.

On 5 January 2018, during a FA Cup match against rivals Everton, Firmino was the subject of controversy following a clash with Everton defender Mason Holgate. Holgate pushed Firmino into the advertising boards, which was followed by the pair exchanging words, with Firmino seemingly insulting the player. Following the match, Holgate accused Firmino of racially abusing him, which he denied. A day later, the Football Association opened an investigation on the matter. Nearly two months later, after they had taken statements from 12 different players, several referees and consulted two Portuguese lip-readers, the Football Association cleared Firmino of any offence as a result of "insufficient evidence".

On 14 January 2018, Firmino scored in a 4–3 home win over Manchester City, which saw Liverpool end City's unbeaten league run. On 10 April, he scored in a 2–1 win over Manchester City in the second leg of the quarter-finals of the UEFA Champions League, which saw Liverpool advance to the semi-finals with a 5–1 aggregate win. Firmino started and played the whole 90 minutes in the 2018 Champions League final, with Liverpool losing 3–1 to Real Madrid.

During the season, Firmino, Mohamed Salah, Philippe Coutinho and Sadio Mané made up a prolific attacking quarter, dubbed the "Fab Four", in reference to the rock band The Beatles, also from the same city as the club. Following the mid-season exit of Coutinho, the three remaining players were dubbed as the "Fab Three", with the trio having a total of 91 goals between them at the end of the season. Firmino was Liverpool's joint top goalscorer in the Champions League, together with Salah, with 11 goals. Firmino was also included in the 2017–18 Champions League Squad of the Season. The 2017–18 season was Firmino's most prolific in his Liverpool career, as he scored 27 goals in all competitions.

2018–19 season 
After going goalless in all three matches played in August, Firmino scored his first goal of the season in a 2–1 Premier League win over Leicester City on 1 September. On 15 September he scored in Liverpool's 2–1 league win over Tottenham Hotspur at Wembley Stadium, a game that saw him leave the field 15 minutes before the end with an eye injury. He came off the bench three days later to score the stoppage time winner in Liverpool's 3–2 Champions League win against Paris Saint-Germain at Anfield. On 29 December, Firmino scored his first Liverpool hat-trick in a 5–1 win over Arsenal, scoring two goals in three minutes and a second half penalty. On 19 January 2019, he scored Liverpool's 1,000th goal at Anfield in the Premier League era in a 4–3 win over Crystal Palace.

On 1 June, Firmino started for Liverpool in the 2019 Champions League final against Tottenham Hotspur, making a comeback after missing the last few weeks of the season with injury. Firmino lasted 60 minutes before being substituted as Liverpool won the match 2–0 to claim the title.

2019–20 season

On 14 August 2019, Firmino came off the bench in the 2019 UEFA Super Cup against Chelsea in a match that Liverpool won 5–4 in a penalty shoot-out. The game had finished 2–2 after 120 minutes, with Firmino setting up both goals for Sadio Mané, before Firmino scored the first penalty in the shoot-out win. On 31 August, Firmino became the first Brazilian player to score 50 goals in the Premier League when he netted the third goal in a 3–0 win over Burnley.

At the 2019 FIFA Club World Cup in December, Firmino scored the winning goal in a 2–1 semi-final win over Monterrey. He was named man of the match in the final three days later after scoring the winner against Flamengo as Liverpool won the competition for the first time.

2020–present
On 13 May 2021, he scored two goals in a 4–2 away win over Manchester United, in Liverpool's first victory at Old Trafford since March 2014. During their following match at West Bromwich Albion, Firmino captained Liverpool for the first time, as he was the longest serving player in the team.

He missed the 2022 EFL Cup final due to injury.

Firmino scored his 100th goal for Liverpool on 27 August 2022 when he got two in the 9–0 win against AFC Bournemouth.

On 10 March 2023, Liverpool announced Firmino would leave Liverpool at the end of the 2022–23 season after he decided not to extend his contract. Liverpool manager Jurgen Klopp said he was a little bit surprised by the decision.

International career

Firmino said that it was his "dream" to play in the national team though he had no "contact with national team manager Dunga". On 23 October 2014, Firmino received his first call up to Brazil national team for the friendly matches against Turkey and Austria. He commented, "I'm very happy about the nomination and would especially like to thank the team". He debuted in a 4–0 win over Turkey on 12 November, replacing fellow debutant Luiz Adriano for the last 17 minutes. Firmino scored his first goal six days later in the latter match, a 2–1 away win.

In May 2015, Firmino was included in Brazil's 23-man squad for the 2015 Copa América to be held in Chile. On 21 June, he scored in a 2–1 defeat of Venezuela to qualify the Seleção for the knockout stage as Group C winners.

In May 2018, he was named in Brazil's 23-man squad for the 2018 FIFA World Cup in Russia. On 2 July, Firmino scored Brazil's second goal in a 2–0 win over Mexico in the round of 16 having come on as a late substitute.

In May 2019, Firmino was included in Brazil's 23-man squad for the 2019 Copa América. Firmino played all 90 minutes of the final against Peru as Brazil won 3–1 to lift their ninth Copa América title.

In June 2021, Firmino was included in Brazil's squad for the 2021 Copa América on home soil. He made a substitute appearance in his nation's 1–0 defeat to rivals Argentina in the final on 10 July.

Firmino was not included in Brazil's squad for the 2022 World Cup in Qatar.

Style of play

Regarded at his peak as one of the greatest strikers in world football, Firmino is known for his clinical finishing, proficient technical ability and impressive workrate.

At Hoffenheim, Firmino primarily played as an attacking midfielder, or as a second striker, but was also used as a forward, winger or central midfielder, with Firmino using his speed, close control and vision wherever he is deployed. After initially starting as a left winger at Liverpool under Brendan Rodgers, new manager Jürgen Klopp used Firmino more centrally, often described as a False 9. In later seasons, especially from the 2020/21 season onward, Firmino has also often been used as a central attacking midfielder in a 4–2–3–1 formation, although tasked with significantly more pressing than a player typically does in such a position.

Ryan Babel, a teammate of Firmino's at Hoffenheim, described him as "A tricky player. He can dribble, shoot, he has a great shot, he can play a lot of through balls and his assists are very good", while also praising a heading ability which would not be common amongst other players of Firmino's slender build and relatively small stature, a unique trait which journalist and ESPN contributor Michael Cox has also noted. Babel also stated that Firmino had a humble mentality and no problems with attitude. Manager Hemerson Maria also stated that he was impressed with Firmino's "strong personality and mentality." In addition to his technical skills, creativity, link-up play, and goalscoring, Firmino has also been praised by his managers, teammates, and pundits for his positional sense, mobility, intelligent movement, and ability to make attacking runs off the ball, which often draws opposing players out of position and creates space for his teammates.

Due to his energy and defensive workrate off the ball, Klopp has referred to Firmino as the "engine" that propels the team's relentless counter-attacking system; "If he loses the ball, he fights for it back. If he loses it again, he fights for it. He looks like the engine of the team." The suitability of Firmino's playing style to Klopp's pressing system has meant that Firmino was referred to as "Liverpool's most important player" on several occasions during the 2016–17 and 2017–18 seasons. Due to Firmino's wide range of skills, Thierry Henry described him as "the most complete striker in the [Premier] League."

Firmino is also well known for his popular "no-look" goals. One of his best known goal celebrations, 'the Matador', features in the FIFA 19 video game.

Personal life
Firmino married Larissa Pereira in his hometown in June 2017. They have three daughters. In November 2022 the couple announced they were expecting a fourth child.

Firmino has been given the nickname "Bobby" by Liverpool fans and players – a shortening of his first name "Roberto".

In December 2016, Firmino was arrested for drunk driving. He was fined £20,000 and had his driving licence revoked for a year when sentenced at Liverpool Magistrates' Court in February 2017.

In addition to his native Portuguese, Firmino also speaks English and German.

Firmino is a Christian and was baptised in 2020 in the swimming pool of Liverpool teammate Alisson Becker.

Career statistics

Club

International

Scores and results list Brazil's goal tally first, score column indicates score after each Firmino goal

Honours
Liverpool
Premier League: 2019–20
FA Cup: 2021–22
FA Community Shield: 2022
UEFA Champions League: 2018–19; runner-up: 2017–18, 2021–22
UEFA Super Cup: 2019
FIFA Club World Cup: 2019
Football League Cup runner-up: 2015–16
UEFA Europa League runner-up: 2015–16

Brazil
Copa América: 2019; runner-up: 2021

Individual
Bundesliga Breakthrough of the Season: 2013–14
PFA Player of the Month: January 2016
PFA Fans' Player of the Month: January 2016
UEFA Champions League Squad of the Season: 2017–18
Samba Gold: 2018

References

External links

Profile at the Liverpool F.C. website

1991 births
Living people
People from Maceió
Sportspeople from Alagoas
Brazilian footballers
Association football wingers
Association football forwards
Figueirense FC players
TSG 1899 Hoffenheim players
Liverpool F.C. players
Campeonato Brasileiro Série B players
Bundesliga players
Premier League players
FA Cup Final players
UEFA Champions League winning players
Brazil international footballers
2015 Copa América players
2018 FIFA World Cup players
2019 Copa América players
2021 Copa América players
Copa América-winning players
Brazilian expatriate footballers
Brazilian expatriate sportspeople in England
Brazilian expatriate sportspeople in Germany
Expatriate footballers in England
Expatriate footballers in Germany
Brazilian Christians